Herbert Israel Brück (b. 13 January 1900 - d. 9 April 1974) was an Austrian ice hockey player. He competed in the men's tournament at the 1928 Winter Olympics. During World War II, he was interned at the Sachsenhausen concentration camp and survived.

References

External links

1900 births
1974 deaths
Austrian ice hockey players
Ice hockey people from Berlin
Ice hockey players at the 1928 Winter Olympics
Olympic ice hockey players of Austria
Sachsenhausen concentration camp survivors
20th-century Austrian people